Manuel José Ramón Matta Aragay (born 10 November 1946) is a Chilean politician, militant from Christian Democratic Party.

References

External links
 BCN Profile

1946 births
Living people
Chilean people
University of Chile alumni
20th-century Chilean politicians
21st-century Chilean politicians
Christian Democratic Party (Chile) politicians